Rabdotus is a genus of air-breathing land snails, terrestrial pulmonate gastropod mollusks in the subfamily Bulimulinae of the family Bulimulidae.

Species 
Species in the genus Rabdotus include:
 Rabdotus abbreviatus (Cooper, 1892)
 Rabdotus alternatus Say, 1830) - Striped Rabdotus 
 Rabdotus artemisia (Binney, 1861)
 Rabdotus baileyi (Dall, 1893)
 Rabdotus ceralboensis (Hanna, 1923)
 Rabdotus chamberlini (Hanna, 1923)
 Rabdotus dealbatus  (Say, 1821) - Whitewashed Rabdotus
 Rabdotus fonsecanus (Haas, 1961)
 Rabdotus inscendens (Binney, 1861)
 Rabdotus levis (Dall, 1893)
 Rabdotus mooreanus (L. Pfeiffer, 1868) - Prairie Rabdotus
  Rabdotus novoleonis (Pilsbry, 1953)
 Rabdotus perhirsutus W. B. Miller, Christensen & Roth, 1990
 Rabdotus pilsbryi (Ferriss, 1925)
 Rabdotus pilula (Binney, 1861)
 Rabdotus ramentosus (Cooper, 1991)
 Rabdotus schiedeanus (L. Pfeiffer, 1841)
 Rabdotus sufflatus (Gould, 1859)
 Rabdotus vegetus (Gould, 1853)

References

 Bank, R. A. (2017). Classification of the Recent terrestrial Gastropoda of the World. Last update: July 16th, 2017

External links
 Albers, J. C. (1850). Die Heliceen nach natürlicher Verwandtschaft systematisch geordnet. Berlin: Enslin. 262 pp.
 Pilsbry, H. A. (1896). Sculpture of the apical whorls, a new character for distinguishing groups of bulimuli. The Nautilus. 9(10): 112-115
 EOL listing
 Two species and a subspecies listed and photographed

Bulimulidae